Manapparai is a town and a municipality in Tiruchirappalli district in the Indian state of Tamil Nadu. Manapparai Town is Located at 38 km Away From Trichy. Manapparai is the headquarters of the Manapparai Taluk. Manapparai is famous for murukku (deep-fried snacks) and cattle market. As of 2011, the town had a population of 40,510.

Demographics

According to the 2011 census, Manapparai had a population of 370,482 with a sex-ratio of 1,012 females for every 1,000 males, much above the national average of 929. A total of 4,090 people were under the age of six, constituting 2,096 males and 1,994 females. Scheduled Castes and Scheduled Tribes accounted for 11.97% and 0.18% of the population respectively. The average literacy of the town was 78.98%, compared to the national average of 72.99%. The town had a total of 9,934 households. There were a total of 14,930 workers, comprising 455 cultivators, 749 main agricultural labourers, 582 in house hold industries, 11,518 other workers, 1,626 marginal workers, 29 marginal cultivators, 470 marginal agricultural labourers, 51 marginal workers in household industries and 1,076 other marginal workers. As per the religious census of 2011, Manapparai (M) had 65.67% Hindus, 11.3% Muslims, 22.95% Christians, 0.01% Sikhs, 0.01% Buddhists, 0.0% Jains, 0.06% following other religions and 0.0% following no religion or did not indicate any religious preference.

Politics
Manaparai is the headquarters of Manaparai Legislative Assembly Constituency, which is part of the Karur Loksabha Constituency. Abdul Samad is the present Member of legislative assembly (MLA) representing Manaparai Constituency and Ms. Jothimani Sennimalai is the present Member of Parliament (MP) representing Karur constituency.

Manapparai Municipality is the local body that governs the town of Manapparai. The Municipality is divided into 27 wards. Municipal Chairman is the head of the local body. The current Municipal Chairman is Geetha. A. Michaelraj.

Notable Festivals
Every year in the Tamil month of Chithirai, The Chithirai festival of Arulmigu Veppilai Marriamman Temple is celebrated over a month long period. Approximately, several Thousands of devotees from various parts of south India attends the festival.

Transport 
Manapparai lies between Trichy and Dindigul in NH 45 (NH 83) . The town is connected with Musiri and Pudukkottai with SH 71. Also, There are also main roads which connect Manappari with Thuvarankurichi ( Via Thuvarankurichy , we can reach Madurai ), and Kovilpatty.

Bus Transportation 
About 300 buses  pass through the municipal bus stand, which is a ‘C’–Class and constructed in 1981. The bus stand was renewed and expanded in the year 2017.

Manapparai is connected with Trichy, DIndigul, Palani, Theni, Kambam , Kumily with frequent bus services. Manapparai is also connected with other towns across Tamil Nadu by bus facilities

Rail Transportation 
Manapparai Railway station ( Station code : MPA ) is situated on Trichy - Dindigul Double electric broad gauge line.

Education 
Manapparai has about 23 schools ,of which 6 are government run, and an Engineering college within the municipality limits. Manapparai Government Arts and Science College is located at Pannankombu, 10 km away from the town.

Religious Places 
 Arulmigu Veppilai Mariyamman Temple 
 Our Lady of Lourdes church
 Valanadu Ponnar Shankar Temple
 Veerapur Ponnar Shankar Temple
 Big Mosque
 Arulmigu Nallandavar Temple 
 Arulmigu Agasteeswarar temple

Adjacent communities 

 Amayapuram
 Veerapur
 Inam Kulathur
 Viralimalai
 Vaiyampatti
 Moovar Kovil

See also
Manapparai Murukku

References

External links 

 Manaparai Municipality Website
 Manaparai Murukku online

Manapparai Live News

Cities and towns in Tiruchirappalli district